Czech Republic competed at the 2004 Summer Olympics in Athens, Greece, from 13 to 29 August 2004. This was the nation's third appearance at the Summer Olympics after gaining its independence from the former Czechoslovakia. The Czech Olympic Committee sent the nation's largest team to the Games since the post-Czechoslovak era. A total of 142 athletes, 80 men and 62 women, competed in 19 sports; the nation's team size was roughly denser from Sydney by one sixth of the athletes. Women's basketball was the only team-based sport in which the Czech Republic had its representation at these Olympic Games. There was only a single competitor in equestrian, artistic and trampoline gymnastics, judo, and weightlifting.

The Czech team featured two defending Olympic champions: slalom kayaker Štěpánka Hilgertová, who made her fourth Olympic appearance as the most experienced female athlete, and javelin throwing legend Jan Železný, who had won three consecutive Olympic titles throughout his illustrious sporting career, and competed at his fifth Olympics. Meanwhile, freestyle swimmer and top medal favorite Květoslav Svoboda was appointed by the committee to carry the Czech flag in the opening ceremony. Other notable Czech athletes featured decathletes and Olympic medalists Roman Šebrle and Tomáš Dvořák, double Olympic champion Martin Doktor in men's sprint canoeing, and rifle shooter Kateřina Kůrková, who eventually married to the American and Olympic rifle prone titleholder Matt Emmons.

Czech Republic left Athens with a total of nine Olympic medals (one gold, three silver, and four bronze), surpassing the record set in Sydney four years earlier by just a single medal. Roman Šebrle, who previously won silver in Sydney, ended a 20-year drought to set an Olympic record and to receive the nation's only gold medal in men's decathlon, while Libor Capalini set a historic milestone for Czech Republic to pick up its first Olympic medal in modern pentathlon. Meanwhile, Věra Pospíšilová-Cechlová originally finished fourth in women's discus throw. On December 5, 2012, the International Olympic Committee stripped off Belarusian Iryna Yatchenko's silver medal after drug re-testings of her samples were found positive, lifting Cechlova's spot to the bronze medal position. For Jan Železný, he ended his sparkling career with a disappointing ninth-place finish in men's javelin throw at his fifth Olympic Games. On August 29, 2004, at the time of the closing ceremony, Zelezny was elected to the IOC Athletes' Commission, along with three other athletes.

Medalists

Athletics

Czech athletes have so far achieved qualifying standards in the following athletics events (up to a maximum of 3 athletes in each event at the 'A' Standard, and 1 at the 'B' Standard). Věra Pospíšilová-Cechlová originally finished fourth in women's discus throw. On December 5, 2012, Belarus' Iryna Yatchenko was ordered to strip off her silver medal by the International Olympic Committee after drug re-testings of her samples were discovered positive, lifting Cechlova's spot to the bronze medal position.

Men
Track & road events

Field events

Combined events – Decathlon

Women
Track & road events

Field events

Combined events – Heptathlon

Basketball

Women's tournament

Roster

Group play

5th place game

Canoeing

Slalom

Sprint

Qualification Legend: Q = Qualify to final; q = Qualify to semifinal

Cycling

Road
Men

Women

Track
Sprint

Pursuit

Time trial

Keirin

Omnium

Mountain biking

Equestrian

Eventing

Gymnastics

Artistic
Women

Rhythmic

Judo

Czech Republic has qualified a single judoka.

Modern pentathlon

Three Czech athletes qualified to compete in the modern pentathlon event through the European and UIPM Championships.

Rowing

Czech rowers qualified the following boats:

Men

Women

Qualification Legend: FA=Final A (medal); FB=Final B (non-medal); FC=Final C (non-medal); FD=Final D (non-medal); FE=Final E (non-medal); FF=Final F (non-medal); SA/B=Semifinals A/B; SC/D=Semifinals C/D; SE/F=Semifinals E/F; R=Repechage

Sailing

Czech sailors have qualified one boat for each of the following events.

Men

Women

Open

M = Medal race; OCS = On course side of the starting line; DSQ = Disqualified; DNF = Did not finish; DNS= Did not start; RDG = Redress given

Shooting 

Seven Czech shooters (five men and two women) qualified to compete in the following events:

Men

Women

Swimming 

Czech swimmers earned qualifying standards in the following events (up to a maximum of 2 swimmers in each event at the A-standard time, and 1 at the B-standard time):

Men

Women

Synchronized swimming 

Two Czech synchronized swimmers qualified a spot in the women's duet.

Table tennis

Four Czech table tennis players qualified for the following events.

Tennis

Czech Republic nominated four male and four female tennis players to compete in the tournament.

Men

Women

Triathlon

Two Czech triathletes in 2004 were veterans, but the nation's defending bronze medallist did not return.  The Czechs' best result in 2004 was a twenty-sixth-place finish.

Volleyball

Beach

Weightlifting 

Czech Republic has qualified a single weightlifter.

Wrestling 

Men's Greco-Roman

See also
 Czech Republic at the 2004 Summer Paralympics

References

External links
Official Report of the XXVIII Olympiad
Czech Olympic Committee 

Nations at the 2004 Summer Olympics
2004
Summer Olympics